Aristonicus of Alexandria (Greek , Aristonikos ho Alexandreus) was a distinguished Greek grammarian who lived during the reigns of Augustus and Tiberius, contemporary with Strabo. He taught at Rome, and wrote commentaries and grammatical treatises.

Works 
Aristonicus is mentioned as the author of several works, most of which were related to the Homeric poems.

 On the wanderings of Menelaus
 On the critical signs of the Iliad and Odyssey, on the marginal signs by which the Alexandrian critics used to mark suspected or interpolated verses in the Homeric poems and in Hesiod's Theogony
 On ungrammatical words, a work of six books on irregular grammatical constructions in Homer

These and some other works are all now lost, with the exception of fragments preserved in the passages above referred to. By far the most important fragments of Aristonicus' work are preserved in the scholia of the Venetus A manuscript of the Iliad.

Editions 
 Scholia on the Iliad:  Erbse, H. 1969–88, Scholia Graeca in Homeri Iliadem, 7 vols. (Berlin)
 Aristonicus' work reconstructed from the Iliad scholia:  Friedländer, L. 1965 [1853], Aristonici Alexandrini περὶ σημείων Ιλιάδος reliquiae emendatiores, reprint (Amsterdam)

See also

Notes

External links
 Online edition of Friedländer at books.google.com (available online or as 13.9 MB PDF file)

Ancient Greek grammarians
Homeric scholars
Roman-era Alexandrians
Hellenistic Egyptians
Year of birth unknown
Year of death unknown
1st-century Egyptian people